Yavuz Can (born 23 February 1987) is a Turkish sprinter specialising in the 400 metres. He won the silver medal in the 4 × 400 metres relay at the 2013 Mediterranean Games. In addition, he competed at two outdoor and two indoor European Championships, as well as the 2012 World Indoor Championships in his native Turkey.

His personal bests in the 400 metres are 45.64 seconds outdoors (Zeulenroda 2016) and 46.87 seconds indoors (Istanbul 2015), both performances was labelled as Turkish national record in this disciplines.

Competition record

References

1987 births
Living people
Turkish male sprinters
Athletes (track and field) at the 2018 Mediterranean Games
Mediterranean Games silver medalists for Turkey
Mediterranean Games medalists in athletics
Competitors at the 2011 Summer Universiade
Competitors at the 2013 Summer Universiade
Islamic Solidarity Games competitors for Turkey
Universiade medalists in athletics (track and field)
Universiade bronze medalists for Turkey
Medalists at the 2013 Summer Universiade
European Games competitors for Turkey
Athletes (track and field) at the 2019 European Games
21st-century Turkish people